The Grammy Award for Best Contemporary Blues Album was awarded from 1988 to 2011 and from 2017 onwards. Until 1992 the award was known as Best Contemporary Blues Performance and in 1989 was awarded to a song rather than to an album.

The award was discontinued after the 2011 Grammy season in a major overhaul of Grammy categories. From 2012 onwards, the category was merged with the Best Traditional Blues Album category to form the new Best Blues Album category. However, in 2016 the Grammy organisation decided to revert the situation back to the pre-2012 era, with two separate categories for traditional and contemporary blues recordings respectively.

Years reflect the year in which the Grammy Awards were handed out, for music released in the previous year. Buddy Guy and Keb' Mo hold the record of most wins in the category with four each, followed by Robert Cray, Stevie Ray Vaughan, Taj Mahal and Fantastic Negrito, all with three wins.

Recipients

References

Album awards
 
Contemporary Blues Album